Lily in Love (alternative English title: Playing for Keeps, Hungarian title: Játszani kell) is a 1984 Hungarian-American co-production in English starring Christopher Plummer, Maggie Smith and Elke Sommer and directed by Károly Makk. The film is the third cinematic adaptation of Ferenc Molnár's play about comedic deception and romance  Testőr after The Guardsman (1931) and The Chocolate Soldier (1941).

Plot
Fitz Wynn (Christopher Plummer), a successful and truly talented but overly satisfied stage actor, wants to star in a new movie written by his wife Lily (Maggie Smith). She does not feel her Fitz is right for the part, and explains to him why and what she is looking for in the role. With the help of his old friend and business partner Jerry (Adolph Green), Fitz orchestrates his own transformation into Roberto Terranova, a blonde Italian alter ego who seems to be exactly what Lily wants for the role. During production of the film in Hungary, Fitz becomes alarmed as Lily seems to fall for his portrayal of Roberto.

Production
In 1977 Smith had starred in a triumphant Toronto stage revival of The Chocolate Soldier, the musical adaptation of the original play. This film was the first screen appearance for Aaron Lustig. According the Smith's biographer, she referred to the film as "the ghoulash" and admitted to not understanding the Hungarian director's direction. She also called her co-star "Christopher Bummer."

Cast
 Christopher Plummer as Fitzroy Wynn / Roberto Terranova
 Maggie Smith as Lily Wynn
 Elke Sommer as Alicia
 Adolph Green as Jerry Silber
 Rosetta LeNoire as Rosanna

Reception
The film received positive reviews at the time of its release. In The New York Times, Vincent Canby proclaimed Plummer's performance as "possibly the best thing he's ever done on the screen."  The Los Angeles Times noted the film's faulty make-up effects: "In this post-"Tootsie” era Plummer’s disguise really must be convincing and not the mere superficial theatrical convention that it is. It’s impossible to believe that he could fool anyone, let alone his wife (who is not sure when she’s first on to him). This is a pity, for Plummer has never been better on the screen."

See also
 The Guardsman (1931)
 The Chocolate Soldier (1941)

References

External links

1984 films
1984 romantic comedy films
1980s English-language films
English-language Hungarian films
Films about actors
American films based on plays
Films based on works by Ferenc Molnár
Films directed by Károly Makk
1980s Hungarian-language films
Hungarian multilingual films
American multilingual films
1984 multilingual films